The Reid, Murdoch & Co. Building, also known as the Reid Murdoch Building, the Reid Murdoch Center or the City of Chicago Central Office Building, is a seven-story office building in Chicago. It was constructed in 1914 and was listed on the National Register of Historic Places in 1975. It also has been designated as a Chicago Landmark. It is located at 325 North LaSalle Street in the River North neighborhood, alongside the Chicago River between LaSalle Street and Clark Street.

History
The building was designed by George C. Nimmons for Reid, Murdoch & Company to be used as offices and a grocery warehouse. It was used as a makeshift hospital on 24 July 1915 after the S.S. Eastland capsized in the Chicago River on the opposite shore, directly across from the building. In 1930 the westernmost bay was demolished, due to the widening of LaSalle Street, and the façade lost its symmetry. From 1955 the building was used by the City of Chicago, housing its traffic courts, the State Attorney's Office, and various city departments. In 1998 it was redeveloped by Friedman Properties. The building currently houses the headquarters of Encyclopædia Britannica.

See also
 Chicago architecture
 Chicago Landmark
Friedman Properties
Property owner's web page for the building

References

External links

Commercial buildings completed in 1914
Commercial buildings on the National Register of Historic Places in Chicago
Chicago Landmarks
Chicago school architecture in Illinois